Langley East is a provincial electoral district for the Legislative Assembly of British Columbia, Canada that was created in the 2015 redistribution from parts of Fort Langley-Aldergrove and Langley. It was first contested in the 2017 election.

History

Election results

External links 
Hi-Res Map (pdf)

References

Langley, British Columbia (district municipality)